Tony Laing (born 22 September 1957) is a Jamaican/British professional light welter/welter/light middleweight boxer of the 1970s and '80s who won the British Boxing Board of Control (BBBofC) Midlands (England) Area light welterweight title, BBBofC British light welterweight title, Commonwealth light welterweight title, and was a challenger for the European Boxing Union (EBU) light welterweight title against Tusikoleta Nkalankete, his professional fighting weight varied from , i.e. light welterweight to , i.e. light middleweight.

Tony Laing is still situated in Nottingham and now trains young boxers across multiple gyms, in classes as well as one-on-one training. He looks as young as ever and still has his comedic humour.

References

External links

1957 births
Living people
Boxers from Nottingham
British male boxers
Jamaican male boxers
Light-middleweight boxers
Light-welterweight boxers
Welterweight boxers
People from Spanish Town